Midge Point is a coastal town and rural locality in the Mackay Region, Queensland, Australia.

Geography 
Midge Point is on the Whitsunday Coast and is the only settlement on the western shores of Repulse Bay (except the Laguna Quay Resort - Currently Closed) until Conway Beach via Proserpine, (Conway by boat 20 km away) and nothing south until St Helens (by boat 24 km away).

Midge Point is the headland from which the town takes its name.

Midge Point closest major town being Proserpine in the Whitsunday Region. Although the Bruce Highway does not pass through Midge Point, it passes through the adjacent town of Bloomsbury with a turnoff to Midge Point Road, offering the traveller a scenic drive to Proserpine via Laguna Quay's.

Whitsunday Coast Airport (PPP) is only 24.2 km away.

History 
In 1937 it was proposed to establish a town, called Midgetown, at Midge Point on 40 acres acquired from farmer A.P. Nielsen. However, the town lots could not be sold until a road had been constructed, including a bridge over the O'Connell River. In November 1938, the Queensland Government and the Pioneer Shire Council had not come to an agreement in relation to paying for the road, so the Queensland Government decided to release the land prior to the road's development. On 23 December 1938, the first town land sites were sold in Midgeton. At the time, Midgeton was described as follows:"Midgeton is noted for its large stretch of unbroken sandy beachand safe bathing. A grassy esplanade runs to high-water mark, and there is a plentiful supply of fresh water. In adjacent waters there are excellent fishing grounds and a number of good catches were reported during the holidays." In 1973 the town's name was changed to Midge Point.

Education 
There are no schools in Midge Point. Bloomsbury State School is the nearest school to Midge Point.

Amenities 
The Mackay Regional Council operates a mobile library service on a fortnightly schedule at Nielsen Parade. (currently not in service)

St Peter's Catholic Church is at 1478 Midge Point Road. It is part of the Farleigh parish.

Public Toilets - available on Neilson Parade, located on the beach front and also at Bundesen Ave Park.

BBQ facilities - available at Bundesen Avenue Park, Bundesen Ave and at the beach front, Neilson Pde.

The Point Tavern - 7 Conder Pde. Lunch and Dinner. Normal Pub hours.

Sealand Take Away and Cafe -  11 Conder Pde. All meals. Closed Tuesdays. Open 10.00am

Accommodation - Whitsundays Cabins - 12 Patterson St. Swimming pool, volleyball court. Undercover parking.

Travellers Rest Caravan and Camping Park - 29 Jackson St.

Public Telephone - available on Bundesen Ave, just on the left entry of the Park.

Post Office - 7 Conder Pde.

Attractions 
Midge Point offers tranquility and remoteness from major towns. Exceptional fishing and crabbing, with boat access via the beach by tractor. The beach is 1.8 km long, south east facing with views to Gould island and Midge Island.The sandy low gradient shallow nature of the bay shore is great for families wanting a day out, kite flying and horse riding.

References

External links 

Towns in Queensland
Mackay Region
Coastline of Queensland
Localities in Queensland